Two Up, Two Down is a British sitcom starring Paul Nicholas and Su Pollard. It aired for one series in 1979 and marked the television comedy debut of Su Pollard, later to become well known as Peggy in Hi-de-Hi!. It was written by Janey Preger.

Cast
Paul Nicholas - Jimmy
Su Pollard - Flo
Norman Tipton - Stan
Claire Faulconbridge - Sheila

Plot
When Stan and Sheila, both fairly strait-laced, move into their new house in Manchester, they discover a pair of hippies, Jimmy and Flo, squatting in their bedroom. As the law will not remove them quickly, they decide to share the house. Stan and Sheila are soon fascinated by Jimmy's and Flo's relaxed lifestyle and philosophy.

Episodes
The series aired for six episodes broadcast on Fridays on BBC One at 8.30pm between 11 May 1979 and 15 June 1979.

Theme
The theme song, also called "Two Up, Two Down", was written by Dominic Bugatti and Frank Musker. It was sung by Paul Nicholas, and released as a single.

Reception
Hazel Holt, writing in The Stage, said it was "full of high spirits and innocent amusement. Perhaps Miss Preger's comedic view is too gentle and kind, a keener cutting edge might have sharpened the satire which, here, was inclined to collapse into a sort of woolly benevolence. Nevertheless, it is an original theme and has got off to a promising start."

The Daily Mirror called it, "A yawn in the bedroom," and said, "[It] could have been funny, but the script by Janey Preger, was far from that... [The cast] tried very hard to make this trite offering as funny as possible, but it was the great bore of the evening".

In 2013, Su Pollard said, "Shows stand or fall on whether the people who produce them can sell the idea properly or not. They billed it as a 'comedy drama', which was ludicrous".

Crew
 Writer: Janey Preger 
 Director: Roger Cheveley 
 Producer: Tara Prem
 Costume designer: Gill Hardie 
 Set designer: Ian Rawnsley

References

Mark Lewisohn, "Radio Times Guide to TV Comedy", BBC Worldwide Ltd, 2003
British TV Comedy Guide for Two Up, Two Down

External links

1979 British television series debuts
1979 British television series endings
1970s British sitcoms
BBC television sitcoms
Squatting in film